A Date with Judy is a 1948 American comedy musical film starring Wallace Beery, Jane Powell, and Elizabeth Taylor. Directed by Richard Thorpe, the film was based on the radio series of the same name.

The film was photographed in Technicolor and largely served to showcase the former child star Elizabeth Taylor, age 16 at the time. Taylor was given the full MGM glamor treatment, including specially designed gowns.

Robert Stack appears in a prominent supporting part. Many others in the MGM stock company appear in their customary roles, including Leon Ames as a dignified father figure, the same role he played in the Judy Garland film Meet Me in St. Louis (1944) and top-billed Wallace Beery in his penultimate role as a contrasting "rough and ready" father figure.

The film features the soprano singing voice of young Jane Powell, and is also a showcase for the musical performances of the Brazilian singer Carmen Miranda and bandleader Xavier Cugat. In this film, Miranda is given to humorous malapropisms such as "His bite is worse than his bark" and "Now I'm cooking with grass". The songs "Judaline" and "It's a Most Unusual Day" also debuted in this film.

Plot
In Santa Barbara, California, teenager Judy Foster (Jane Powell) and her friends are rehearsing songs for their high school dance when the student director of the show, Carol Pringle (Elizabeth Taylor), complains that the songs, as performed, are too "juvenile." Carol, a senior at the school and a renowned snob, demonstrates how the music should be played, and gives the song a more seductive flavor.

Later, Carol tells Judy that famous band leader Xavier Cugat will be the guest of honor at the dance, and urges her to wear her pink dress for the occasion. When Judy learns that her sweetheart, Ogden "Oogie" Pringle (Scotty Beckett), who is Carol's brother, has decided not to take her to the dance, she becomes infuriated and vows to break off her friendship with him. Dejected, Judy visits Pop's Soda Fountain, where she meets Pop's handsome nephew, Stephen Andrews (Robert Stack). Judy falls instantly in love with the older Stephen, and he agrees to take her to the dance as a favor to Pop. At the dance, Oogie sees Judy with Stephen and becomes jealous. While Oogie tries to divert Judy's attention away from Stephen, Stephen meets Carol and believes he has found "the most beautiful girl in Santa Barbara."

After the dance, Carol tries to help Oogie and Judy get back together by telling Judy that she has convinced her wealthy father to give Judy and Oogie a program on his radio station. Meanwhile, Rosita Conchellas (Carmen Miranda), a dance instructor, secretly meets with Judy's father Melvin (Wallace Beery) to teach him the rumba, which he hopes to dance on his wedding anniversary. When Oogie tries to make amends with Judy at a dinner arranged by Carol, a misunderstanding arises that leads to his being further alienated from his sweetheart. Judy, however, shows no signs of a broken heart, and later tells her father that she is in love with Stephen and that she intends to marry him.

When Judy discovers Rosita's skirt caught in the closet door of her father's office, she incorrectly concludes that her father is having an affair. Determined to save her parents' marriage, Judy runs home and gives her mother Dora (Selena Royle) a beauty makeover to make her more appealing to her father. Oogie, in his tireless determination to reunite with Judy, tries to serenade her, but another misunderstanding arises and the plan is spoiled. Judy becomes convinced that her father is planning to leave her mother when she and Carol see him escorting Rosita to his car. Carol and Judy later accuse Rosita of breaking up Judy's home. Rosita misunderstands the accusation and believes that they are talking about Cugat, her fiancé. When Judy and Carol finally realize their mistake, they apologize to Rosita. Judy then reconciles with Oogie after she learns that Carol is in love with Stephen, and Stephen agrees to resume his romance with Carol in a few years, when she is older.

Cast
 Wallace Beery as Melvin R. Foster
 Jane Powell as Judy Foster
 Elizabeth Taylor as Carol Pringle
 Carmen Miranda as Rosita Cochellas
 Xavier Cugat as Himself
 Robert Stack as Stephen Andrews
 Scotty Beckett as Ogden "Oogie" Pringle
 Selena Royle as Dora Foster
 Leon Ames as Lucien T. Pringle
 Clinton Sundberg as Jameson 
 George Cleveland as Gramps 
 Lloyd Corrigan as "Pop" Sam Scully
 Stuart Whitman as Young Man in the ballroom (uncredited) 
 Jerry Hunter as Randolph Foster 
 Jean McLaren as Mitzi Hoffman
 Lillian Yarbo as Nightingale (uncredited)

Songs 
 "It's a Most Unusual Day" (Harold Adamson, Jimmy McHugh) performed by Jane Powell
 "Cuanto Le Gusta" (Gabriel Ruiz, Ray Gilbert) performed by Carmen Miranda with Xavier Cugat and His Orchestra
 "Cooking with Gas" performed by Carmen Miranda with Xavier Cugat and His Orchestra
 "Judaline" (Don Raye, Gene de Paul) performed by Jane Powell, Scotty Beckett & Quartet
 "I'm Strictly on the Corny Side" (Stella Unger, Alec Templeton) performed by Jane Powell & Scotty Beckett
 "Love is Where You Find It" (Earl K. Brent, Nacio Herb Brown) performed by Jane Powell, Jerry Hunter & Selena Royle
 "Home Sweet Home" (H.R. Bishop) performed by Jane Powell, Jerry Hunter & Selena Royle
 "Swing Low, Sweet Chariot" (Wallace Willis) performed by Lillian Yarbo

Production

Although Xavier Cugat is credited in the opening credits as "Xavier Cugat and His Orchestra," the end credits simply bill Cugat as "Himself." The A Date with Judy radio show ran from 1941 to 1949 on the NBC network, and from 1949 to 1950 on the ABC network. The character of "Judy Foster" was portrayed on the radio by Dellie Ellis (later known as Joan Lorring), Louise Erickson and Ann Gillis.

Thomas E. Breen was originally set to co-star in the film with Jane Powell, and Leslie Kardos was set to direct. Selena Royle replaced Mary Astor, who withdrew from the film due to illness.

A biography of director Vincente Minnelli notes that a musical number entitled Mulligatawny, which was created by Stanley Donen, was cut from the film before its release. Actress Patricia Crowley portrayed "Judy Foster" in the ABC television series A Date with Judy, which ran from 1951 to 1953.

Reception
The film was a hit, earning $3,431,000 in the US and Canada and $1,155,000 elsewhere resulting in a profit of $1,495,000.

Critical reception 
The New York Times reviewer pointed out that "the picture's gaiest moments" were provided by Carmen Miranda, "whose singing remains a source of delighted amazement to this observer."

Notes

External links
 
 
 
 
 A Date with Judy at NNDB
 

1948 films
1948 musical comedy films
1948 romantic comedy films
American musical comedy films
American romantic musical films
1940s English-language films
Films about music and musicians
Films based on radio series
Films directed by Richard Thorpe
Films set in Santa Barbara, California
Metro-Goldwyn-Mayer films
Films produced by Joe Pasternak
1940s American films